Elaan is a 1971 Bollywood Sci-Fi thriller film directed by K. Ramanlal. The film stars Vinod Mehra, Rekha, Vinod Khanna, and Madan Puri . The rights to this film are owned by Shah Rukh Khan's Red Chillies Entertainment.

Plot
Naresh Kumar Saxena lives with his widowed mom and sister, Seema. He works as a freelance photographer and journalist. One day he meets with Mala Mehta and her dad, who is the Editor of a Newspaper. Mr. Mehta hires Naresh and assigns him to go to a remote island to investigate and expose some illegal activities there. Naresh goes there in the company of his friend, Shyam. Unfortunately, they are caught by the island guards and Lily tries to convince them to work for the gang . On refusal Naresh is lodged in a cell along with two others, one a scientist and the other is Ram Singh, a hoodlum. The scientist confides in Naresh that he has invented an atomic ring that when inserted in someone's mouth will turn that person invisible, and subsequently passes away. Naresh puts the ring in his mouth, takes off his clothes, turns invisible and escapes. The news of his escape creates waves in the underworld and the Boss and Mr. Verma join forces to find Naresh, kill him, and keep the ring for themselves. For this they send Ram Singh and Lily to Bombay . Naresh and Shyam return to Bombay and are given Police protection . Meanwhile, the goons kill Mr. Mehta. Mala decided to take revenge for her dad's murder and joins the Central Bureau of Investigation (CBI). Naresh and Shyam also start working for the CBI to catch the gang. Shyam identifies Lily in a newspaper ad for a club and they go in disguise to find the truth. The remaining story focuses on Naresh, Shyam and Mala's struggle against Boss, Verma, Ram Singh and the gang.

Cast
Vinod Mehra as Naresh Kumar Saxena 
Vinod Khanna as Ram Singh 
Rekha as Mala Mehta / Mary 
Rajendra Nath as Shyam
M. B. Shetty as Boss
Madan Puri as Mr. Verma 
Jankidas as Professor 
Helen as Lily 
Dulari as Mrs. Saxena (Naresh's mom) 
Brahm Bhardwaj as Mr. Mehta (Mala's dad) 
Birbal as Traffic cop 
Hercules as Wrestler 
Iftekhar as Police Chief 
Rashid Khan as Jockey 
Jagdish Raj as Police Inspector 
Sanjana as Seema Saxena 
Sabeena as Vamp.

Music
"Jaanab-e-man Salaam Hai, Zarina Mera Naam Hai" - Sharda
"Ang Se Ang Laga Le Sanso Me Hai Tufaan" - Lata Mangeshkar
"Aapki Raaye Mere Bare Me Kya Hai" - Sharda, Mohammed Rafi
"Aath Me Aath Ko Jamaa Karo Usme Dalo Do Pure" - Sharda
"Aaj Tumhare Kaan Me Keh Du Mere Dil Me Kya Hai" - Asha Bhosle

Trivia
Naresh uses a unique ring invented by a nuclear scientist, that makes a person invisible. This concept was later used in the hit movie Mr. India (1987 film)

In one scene, Rekha is shown using a smartwatch as a mobile communication device, which has now become a reality!

External links
 

1971 films
1970s Hindi-language films
1970s science fiction thriller films
Films scored by Shankar–Jaikishan
Indian science fiction thriller films
Indian science fiction films